The Schuylkill Expressway Bridge, built in 1956 by the Pennsylvania Department of Transportation, and reconstructed and painted blue in 2010, carries the Schuylkill Expressway (I-76) over the Schuylkill River between West Philadelphia and the Grays Ferry section of South Philadelphia.

See also
 
 
 
 
 List of crossings of the Schuylkill River

References

Bridges in Philadelphia
Bridges over the Schuylkill River
Bridges completed in 1956
Road bridges in Pennsylvania
Interstate 76 (Ohio–New Jersey)
Bridges on the Interstate Highway System
Steel bridges in the United States
Plate girder bridges in the United States